São Filipe Airport (also: Aeródromo do Fogo)   is Cape Verde's fifth most-used airport, located in the island of Fogo. It is located 2 km southeast of the town of São Filipe, near the Atlantic Ocean. It is used for domestic flights only.

The airport was completed in 1997, replacing a smaller airfield at the same location. The maximum single-wheel load is 20 tonnes.

Airlines and destinations

Statistics

See also
Airports in Cape Verde
List of buildings and structures in Cape Verde

References

External links

Airports in Cape Verde
Fogo, Cape Verde